Charley's Aunt is a 1963 Austrian comedy film directed by Géza von Cziffra and starring Peter Alexander, Maria Sebaldt and Peter Vogel. It is an adaptation of the 1892 British play Charley's Aunt by Brandon Thomas.

It was shot at the Rosenhügel Studios in Vienna.

Cast
Peter Alexander as Doctor Otto Wilder
Maria Sebaldt as Carlotta Ramirez
Peter Vogel as Charley Sallmann
Eike Pulver as Ulla Bergström
 as Britta Nielsen
Alfred Böhm as Ralf Wilder
 as Mona
Ljuba Welitsch as Frau Generalkonsul
Rudolf Carl as Wolke
Fritz Eckhardt as August Sallmann
 as Chauffeur Heinrich
Hans Unterkircher as Generalkonsul
Rudolf Vogel as Niels Bergström

References

External links

Charleys Tante, filmportal.de

1963 comedy films
Austrian comedy films
Films directed by Géza von Cziffra
Austrian films based on plays
Films based on Charley's Aunt
Films shot at Rosenhügel Studios
Sascha-Film films
Constantin Film films
1960s German-language films